Lia Zoppelli (16 November 1920 – 2 January 1988) was an Italian stage, television and film actress.

Life and career 
Born in Milan, Zoppelli made her stage debut in 1939, shortly after her high school graduation, with the company Maltagliati-Cimara-Ninchi. Mainly active on stage, in the subsequent seasons she worked with Ruggero Ruggeri (1940–41) and Memo Benassi (1942–43), then, after the war, she notably worked with Luchino Visconti and with Giorgio Strehler at the Piccolo Teatro. In cinema, Zoppelli became a popular character actress starting from the late 1950s, usually in comedic roles; she was also active on television, where she gained a large popularity thanks to her appearances with Enrico Viarisio in Carosello.

Partial filmography

 Il sogno di tutti (1940) - La fanciulla sedotta
 Processo delle zitelle (1945) - Sara
 Uncle Was a Vampire (1959) - Letizia
 La cambiale (1959) - La moglie di Alfredo
 Cerasella (1959)
 Genitori in blue-jeans (1960) - Wanda
 The Traffic Policeman (1960) - Mayor's Wife
 Who Hesitates Is Lost (1960) - Comm. Pasquetti's sister
 Le ambiziose (1961)
 Sua Eccellenza si fermò a mangiare (1961) - Countess Clara Bernabei
 Gioventù di notte (1961) - Madre di Marco
 Totòtruffa 62 (1961) - The Headmistress in 'Lausanne' College
 Scandali al mare (1961) - Contessa Anna Degli Annesi
 The Corsican Brothers (1961) - Aunt Mary
 La monaca di Monza (1962) - La Governante
 Gli italiani e le donne (1962) - Renata (segment "Chi la fa l'aspetti")
 Avventura al motel (1963) - Gertrude
 The Shortest Day (1963) - Erede Siciliana (uncredited)
 Toto and Cleopatra (1963) - Fulvia
 La pupa (1963) - Elena Patella
 Samson and His Mighty Challenge (1964) - Nemea
 Soldati e capelloni (1967) - Dolores
 Anyone Can Play (1968) - Luisa's mother
 We Are All in Temporary Liberty (1971) - Atelier owner
 Rosina Fumo viene in città... per farsi il corredo (1972) - Miss Zanelli
 Count Tacchia (1982) - Duchessa Savello
 La casa stregata (1982) - Anastasia

References

External links 

Actresses from Milan
Italian stage actresses
Italian television actresses
Italian film actresses
1920 births
1988 deaths
20th-century Italian actresses